There is an ambiguity about the highest Lebanese village, although this ambiguity is not official. Lebanon is a country that has an average altitude of about 1000 meters above sea level, and contains the highest villages in the Middle East. The main villages of concern are Bekaa Kafra, Ainata, Kfardebian, Laqlouq, Tfail, Ouyoun Orghoch, and Souaqi. The information concerning altitudes given below is confirmed and based on Google Earth elevation indicator.

Bekaa Kafra 
A village in the Bsharri District. The denomination is a Syriac word composed of “Bekaa” which means “land”, and “Kafra” which means “fertility and goodness”. Consequently, Bekaakafra means the fertile land.

       It is the highest inhabited town in Lebanon and the Middle East with an altitude of 1800m. It is also the birthplace of the famous Catholic Maronite Saint Charbel Makhlouf. 
From this wonderful sitting, from Bekaa Kafra, on the left side, you can see Bsharri the city and the birth place of the Lebanese – American Philosopher, writer, artist Gibran Khalil Gibran (1883–1931).

From the same place, you can see the deepest and most beautiful valley in Lebanon Wadi Kadisha, the Holy Valley, where were scattered monasteries, churches, hermitages, and caves. And where the wild flowers and trees grow in abundance.

The Lebanese historian Fouad Efram El-Boustany brings back Bekaa Kafra to the 10th century. According to the study of the “Memory of European Housing institute”, Bekaa Kafra  history goes back to 2000 years.

Ainata 
Ainata is a village located in Northern Lebanon, between the Bsharri District and the Baalbek District.

Ouyoun Al Siman and Faqra  
Ouyoun al Simane and Faqra are both villages in Kfardebian, but they consist only of ski resorts, winter resorts and hotels and villas. They also offer great spots for observing wild mountain-goat behavior.

Tfail 
Tfail is a very remote village in Eastern Baalbek District

Ouyoun Orghoch 
Ouyoun Orghoch is a Lebanese locality located at the Eastern slopes of Qurnat as Sawda', and it consists of a lake, a few restaurants, and little houses but virtually no permanent residents. It rises 2100 m above sea level and while it is sometimes considered as a village, it cannot enter the list of the highest villages because it has no official municipality or mayor. It contains a factory for processing and packaging of mountain-goat manure which is plentiful in the region.

Populated places in Lebanon